Stephen Dick (born 21 June 1985 in Kirkcaldy) is a Scottish field hockey player who plays as a forward. He is 6'1".

Competing for Scotland and Great Britain at numerous tournaments, he is representing Great Britain in Field hockey at the 2008 Summer Olympics. He has 68 caps representing Scotland and 24 caps representing Great Britain as of 11 August 2008. He attended Balwearie High School.

He was a player for Edinburgh University Men's Hockey Club during his time as a student at University of Edinburgh. He was awarded the EUSU Vancouver Quaich for best athletic performance by a male student for the 2008/09 season, and the Scottish Universities Sport's Athlete of the Year award in 2009. He is widely regarded as one of the greatest players to grace the fields of Peffermill as 'a true Gambler of Edinburgh University Hockey'.

References
Profile at www.greatbritainhockey.co.uk

External links
 

1985 births
Living people
Scottish male field hockey players
Olympic field hockey players of Great Britain
British male field hockey players
Field hockey players at the 2006 Commonwealth Games
Field hockey players at the 2008 Summer Olympics
People educated at Balwearie High School
Commonwealth Games competitors for Scotland